La Plaza Mall is a regional shopping mall located in McAllen, Texas, at the intersection of Interstate 2 (Expressway 83) and 10th Street.  It has  of gross leasable area and features 184 specialty stores, many of which are flagship stores, and restaurants. The mall is one of the highest-grossing operated by Simon, and the largest mall in south Texas.

An original tenant of the mall was a Woolworth dime store, the second in McAllen, which closed in 1997. 1998 expansion brought Dillard's as an additional anchor. Another original tenant was a Jones & Jones department store, which was sold to Foley's in 2000 and again to Macy's in 2006.

Anchors
 Dillard's
 JCPenney
 Macy's
 Macy's Home and Children's Store

Former anchors
 Sears - closed November 2015. Replaced by an expansion of La Plaza Mall, opened in late 2017.

References

Shopping malls in Texas
Simon Property Group
Shopping malls established in 1976
McAllen, Texas
1976 establishments in Texas